Xanthodaphne bougainvillensis is a species of sea snail, a marine gastropod mollusk in the family Raphitomidae.

Description

Distribution
This marine species was found on the Bougainville Trench, New Guinea.

References

 SYSOEV, AV. "Découvertes de mollusques ultra-abyssaux de la famille des Turridae (Gastropoda, Toxoglossa) dans l'Océan Pacifique. I: Sous-famille des Daphnellinae." Zoologičeskij žurnal 67.7 (1988): 965-972.

External links
 

bougainvillensis
Gastropods described in 1988